Pier Francesco Cavazza (1675 – 14 October 1755) was an Italian painter and art collector, active in his native Bologna.

History
He trained in Bologna under Giovanni Maria Viani, where he was influenced by the works of Guercino. Unlike other Viani pupils, he became less interested in painting, and accumulated a large collection of engravings and drawings. Upon his death, the collection was dispersed.
Cavazza died in Bologna.

References

1675 births
1755 deaths
17th-century Italian painters
Italian male painters
18th-century Italian painters
Painters from Bologna
Italian Baroque painters
Italian art collectors
18th-century Italian male artists